Álida España (12 April 1924 – 8 April 1993) was a Guatemalan activist and politician. She was the wife of President Carlos Manuel Arana Osorio, First Lady of Guatemala during his government.

During the government of her husband, she played a leading role. It was known for its social work in favor of children, creating the Board of Social Works of the President's Wife, which helped the most vulnerable. After the presidency of her husband, she died in 1993. Different institutions are named after her. Arana Osorio died in 2003.

References

1924 births
1993 deaths
First ladies of Guatemala
20th-century Guatemalan women politicians
20th-century Guatemalan politicians